Roy Hall (born December 8, 1983) is a motivational speaker, executive coach and former American football wide receiver who spent five seasons in the National Football League. He was selected by the Indianapolis Colts in the fifth round of the 2007 NFL Draft. He played for the Ohio State Buckeyes, completing his college career in the 2007 BCS National Championship Game.

Roy is currently a motivational speaker, executive coach and podcast host that inspires people in a corporate environment through lessons learned within his football career.  Hall is also Executive Director and co-founder of the Columbus, Ohio-based non-profit Driven Foundation, established in 2008.

Early years
Roy Hall was born in Cleveland, Ohio. Hall played high school football at Brush High School in Lyndhurst, Ohio. He was a standout student athlete, carrying a 3.8 GPA while honored as a first-team All-Ohio football and basketball star. Hall was nationally ranked in the top-10 high school wide receivers.

College career
Hall was a wide receiver for the Ohio State University Buckeyes. Hall had six catches for 69 yards his freshman year. He continued to improve during his sophomore season racking up 17 catches for 230 yards. In his junior season he had 16 catches for 134 yards. In his senior season, he ended up with 13 catches for 147 yards. He played in the 2007 BCS National Championship Game. While Hall was not invited to the 2007 NFL combine, had an impressive performance at Pro Day where he ran a 4.32 40-year dash to get the attention of the Indianapolis Colts.

Professional career
Motivational Speaker: As a motivational speaker Hall has focused on helping professionals master mental toughness (mindset), consistently perform under pressure (high stress environments), and maintain motivation. He has spent over a decade speaking to corporations, at business conferences, professional development seminars, and virtual training sessions. Hall used the mental skills and tools gained as a football player to inspire professionals to perform in high stress situations and neutralize challenges in the workplace that influence disengagement.

Executive Director, Driven Foundation: Roy Hall co-founded the Driven Foundation with former teammate Antonio Smith in 2008.  The foundation works to provide families with basic needs to combat poverty and promote independence. In addition to combatting hunger in their local communities, Hall developed curriculum designed to help young people across Ohio overcome challenges and build the foundation for future success. His work in Ohio schools has impacted thousands of children, mainly young men from 5th-8th grade. Since 2008, the Driven foundation has distributed 1.2 million pounds of free food to 8,500 central Ohio families, 600 coats to kids, and more than 2,500 backpacks filled with school supplies.

Indianapolis Colts
Hall started his professional football career with the Colts, drafted in April 2007. In his rookie year, during a week three game against the Houston Texans, Hall was involved in a dangerous special-teams collision with Texans defensive tackle Cedric Killings. The collision damaged a vertebra in Killings' neck, ending his season, and ultimately leading him to retire. This injury caused him to be placed on the Injured Reserve, ending Hall's season after only three games.

Hall suffered a knee injury in 2008, but still played 4 games for the Colts, catching one pass for 9 yards and recording three special teams tackles.

In the 2009 season Hall underwent knee surgery and was placed on injured reserve.

New Orleans Saints
Hall signed with the New Orleans Saints on May 12, 2010. He was waived/injured on June 15, and subsequently placed on injured reserve. He was released from injured reserve with an injury settlement on June 21.

Detroit Lions
Hall was signed to the Detroit Lions practice squad on December 14, 2010. He was not re-signed following the 2010 season.

References

External links
Indianapolis Colts bio
Just Sports Stats

1983 births
Living people
People from South Euclid, Ohio
Sportspeople from Cuyahoga County, Ohio
Players of American football from Ohio
African-American players of American football
American football wide receivers
Ohio State Buckeyes football players
Indianapolis Colts players
New Orleans Saints players
Detroit Lions players
21st-century African-American sportspeople
20th-century African-American people